The Jasionka gas field in Poland was discovered onshore in 2001. It began production of natural gas in 2002. The total proven reserves of the Jasionka gas field are around 70 billion cubic feet (2×109m³).

References

Natural gas fields in Poland